Journey to Le Mans is a 2014 British documentary film directed by Charlotte Fantelli about British Privateer Team Jota Sport on their bid to win the 24 Hours of Le Mans in the LMP2 category in 2014. This film represents Charlotte Fantelli's directorial debut.

Story 
The film tells the story of racing driver and entrepreneur Simon Dolan and the rest of his motorsport team Jota Sport, following the highs and lows the team encountered. Charlotte Fantelli is Simon Dolan's business partner. Simon Dolan is currently the sole Company Director and the sole person with significant control for Fantelli Productions Limited.

Cast
The film is narrated by Patrick Stewart and Tiff Needell with commentary from Radio Le Mans. As well as featuring Simon Dolan, the film also focuses on his teammates Oliver Turvey and Harry Tincknell, plus guest stars Harry’s mentor, three time Le Mans winner Allan McNish and ex Formula One driver Mark Webber, and appearances by Filipe Albuquerque, Bob Friend, Marc Gené, Sam Hignett, John Hindhaugh, and Pete Webster.

Production
Talking about the making of the film, Fantelli described the minimal sleep, effort and sacrifices she made to ensure that the film was completed. Fantelli's ambition was for Journey to Le Mans to portray a more accurate representation of what it feels like to be a racer, examining both the physical and mental pressures experienced by not only the drivers but their teams as well.  The team's Jota LMP2 car uses a Nismo tuned Nissan engine and reaches a top speed of more than 180 mph.

Distribution 
Journey to Le Mans was released in a limited number of cinemas across the United Kingdom for one night only, which included a Q&A with cast and crew. The DVD was released 14 November by Kaleidoscope Home Entertainment, while a director's cut of the documentary was broadcast on the ITV4 television channel on 4 December 2014.

References

External links 
 
 

Films
2014 films
2014 documentary films
European Le Mans Series
British auto racing films
2010s English-language films
British sports documentary films
2010s British films